Cai Xiaoli (born 21 November 1979), also known as Cai Xiao Li, is a retired Chinese-born Singaporean international table tennis player.

Cai was born in Beijing, China in 1979. He moved to Singapore under the Foreign Sports Talent Scheme.

In 2004 he won the Commonwealth Championships mixed doubles with partner Zhang Xueling. He was on Singapore A team at the 2006 Australian Open, where he won the Mixed Doubles with partner Sun Beibei.

In January 2008 his world ranking was 155.

Cai competed at the following international events:
 World Championships: 2005 men's singles, 2007 men's singles, 2007 mixed doubles, 2009 men's singles, 2009 men's doubles, 2009 mixed doubles
 Olympic Games: 2008 men's team
 Commonwealth Games: 2002, 2006, 2010 men's singles, 2010 mixed doubles
 Asian Games: 2002 men's singles, 2002 men's doubles, 2002 mixed doubles, 2006 men's doubles, 2006 men's team, 2010 men's team
 Southeast Asian Games: 1999, 2001, 2003, 2005, 2007, and 2009
Cai retired in 2011 and became the assistant coach of the national women's table tennis team.

References

External links
 
 
 
 

1979 births
Living people
Table tennis players from Beijing
Chinese emigrants to Singapore
Singaporean sportspeople of Chinese descent
Naturalised citizens of Singapore
Naturalised table tennis players
Chinese male table tennis players
Singaporean male table tennis players
Asian Games competitors for China
Commonwealth Games gold medallists for Singapore
Commonwealth Games medallists in table tennis
Competitors at the 2001 Southeast Asian Games
Competitors at the 2003 Southeast Asian Games
Competitors at the 2005 Southeast Asian Games
Competitors at the 2007 Southeast Asian Games
Competitors at the 2009 Southeast Asian Games
Olympic table tennis players of Singapore
Southeast Asian Games bronze medalists for Singapore
Southeast Asian Games gold medalists for Singapore
Southeast Asian Games medalists in table tennis
Southeast Asian Games silver medalists for Singapore
Table tennis players at the 2002 Asian Games
Table tennis players at the 2002 Commonwealth Games
Table tennis players at the 2006 Asian Games
Table tennis players at the 2006 Commonwealth Games
Table tennis players at the 2008 Summer Olympics
Table tennis players at the 2010 Asian Games
Table tennis players at the 2010 Commonwealth Games
Medallists at the 2002 Commonwealth Games
Medallists at the 2006 Commonwealth Games
Medallists at the 2010 Commonwealth Games